Ben Alexander Moore (born May 13, 1995) is an American professional basketball player for Hapoel Be'er Sheva of the Israeli Basketball Premier League. He played college basketball for Southern Methodist University (SMU).

College career
Moore came to SMU from Bolingbrook High School in Bolingbrook, Illinois where he was an all-state honorable mention honoree and a finalist for Illinois Mr. Basketball. During his freshman season he was named American Athletic Conference Rookie of the Week three times on November 11, 2013, January 27 and February 10, 2014. He finished his college career averaging 9 points and 5.8 rebounds a game.

Professional career

Fort Wayne Mad Ants (2017–2018)
Moore went undrafted for the 2017 NBA draft. On June 23, 2017, Moore signed a partially-guaranteed contract with the Indiana Pacers to be able to join their roster for the 2017 NBA Summer League. On August 15, 2017, Moore signed with the Fort Wayne Mad Ants of the NBA G League as an affiliate player from the Indiana Pacers.

Indiana Pacers (2018)
On January 12, 2018, Moore signed a two-way contract with the Indiana Pacers. Throughout the rest of the season, he split his playing time between the Pacers and their NBA G League affiliate, the Fort Wayne Mad Ants. Moore made his NBA debut on January 24, 2018 against the Phoenix Suns, playing three minutes. On September 21, 2018, Moore re-signed with the Pacers. On November 3, 2018, Moore was waived by the Indiana Pacers.

Second Stint with Fort Wayne Mad Ants (2018)
On November 6, 2018, the Fort Wayne Mad Ants announced that they had reacquired Moore.

San Antonio Spurs (2018–2019)
Moore signed a two-way contract with the San Antonio Spurs, splitting time with the Austin Spurs of the G League, on November 20, 2018. On July 1, 2019, it was reported that no qualifying offer was issued for Moore, despite that Moore was listed in the Spurs' roster for 2019 NBA Summer League hosted at Vivint Smart Home Arena.

Galatasaray Doğa Sigorta (2019)
On September 12, 2019, he has signed with Galatasaray Doğa Sigorta of the Basketbol Süper Ligi. On December 2, 2019, he parted ways with Galatasaray.

Third Stint with Fort Wayne Mad Ants (2019–2020)
On December 12, 2019, the Fort Wayne Mad Ants announced that they had acquired Moore. In a game against the Capital City Go-Go on January 13, 2020, Moore scored 17 points and grabbed a career-high 19 rebounds. He averaged 13.9 points and 9.2 rebounds per game.

South East Melbourne Phoenix (2020–2021)
On November 9, 2020, Moore signed a one-year deal with the South East Melbourne Phoenix of the National Basketball League (NBL). He averaged 10.4 points and 6.4 rebounds per game.

Memphis Hustle (2022)
On February 6, 2022, Moore was acquired by the Memphis Hustle of the NBA G League.

Mets de Guaynabo (2022)
On April 2, 2022 Moore signed with the Mets de Guaynabo of the BSN. He averaged 18.1 points (8th in the league), 9.1 rebounds (6th), 1 steal, and 1 block per game, with a .630 field goal percentage (7th).

Hapoel Be'er Sheva (2022–present)
On July 30, 2022, he signed with Hapoel Be'er Sheva of the Israeli Basketball Premier League.

Career statistics

NBA

Regular season 

|-
| style="text-align:left;"| 
| style="text-align:left;"| Indiana
| 2 || 0 || 4.5 || – || – || – || .5 || .5 || .0 || .0 || .0
|- class="sortbottom"
| style="text-align:center;" colspan="2" | Career
| 2 || 0 || 4.5 || – || – || – || .5 || .5 || .0 || .0 || .0

References

1995 births
Living people
21st-century African-American sportspeople
African-American basketball players
American expatriate basketball people in Australia
American men's basketball players
Austin Spurs players
Basketball players from Illinois
Fort Wayne Mad Ants players
Galatasaray S.K. (men's basketball) players
Hapoel Be'er Sheva B.C. players
Indiana Pacers players
Memphis Hustle players
People from Bolingbrook, Illinois
Power forwards (basketball)
SMU Mustangs men's basketball players
South East Melbourne Phoenix players
Sportspeople from DuPage County, Illinois
Undrafted National Basketball Association players
United States men's national basketball team players